Pulse (full title: Pulse: Volume One) is a music game developed by Philadelphia-based studio Cipher Prime. The game was released in 2011 for iPad and in 2013 for Android. In June 2013 it was offered along with Aquaria, Organ Trail, Stealth Bastard Deluxe, and Fractal as part of the Humble Bundle with Android 6.

Gameplay 
Pulse'''s interface displays a fixed set of concentric rings, and a colorful moving ring that radiates from the center of the screen. Circular nodes appear atop the concentric rings, and the player conducts music by tapping the nodes when the ring of color intersects them.

 Soundtrack 
The original Pulse: Volume One soundtrack was composed and recorded in-house by Cipher Prime co-founder Dain Saint and Kerry Gilbert. In June 2011, an update to the game (Pulse: Philly is Golden) was released, introducing four new tracks by local Philadelphia artists. A second update (Pulse: It's a Prime Christmas) was released in December 2011, adding another four tracks by Jim Guthrie, Leemus Music, 6955, and Doomcloud to the game. The original soundtrack and the updates' tracks are available for download on Cipher Prime's website.

 Reception Pulse'' received generally favorable reviews, gaining an aggregate review score of 77 on Metacritic.

References

External links 
 Pulse's official website
 Pulse's soundtrack
 Pulse: Philly Is Golden soundtrack
 Pulse: It's a Prime Christmas soundtrack

2011 video games
Android (operating system) games

IOS games
Music video games
Single-player video games
Video games developed in the United States